Caloptilia aeolocentra is a moth of the family Gracillariidae. It is known from India (Assam, Meghalaya).

References

aeolocentra
Moths described in 1922
Moths of Asia